PBC CSKA Junior, formerly known as CSKA-2, is the youth team of the basketball club CSKA Moscow and is based in Moscow, Russia. The team currently competes in VTB United Youth League.

CSKA Junior is the most successful team in Euroleague NGT, having won the tournament 3 times in a row.

Club plays its home games in Universal Sports Hall CSKA.

Honours and achievements

Club
 Euroleague NGT
 Winners (3): 2003–04, 2004–05, 2005–06
 VTB United Youth League
 Champions (4): 2014–15, 2015–16, 2016–17, 2017-18
 Runners-up (1): 2018–19
 Russian Youth Basketball Championship
 Champions (22): 1991–2012
 Russian Youth SuperCup
 Winners (1): 2015
 Galis Basketball (friendly)
 Winners (1): 2019

Individual
 Euroleague NGT Finals MVP
 Vasiliy Zavoruev – 2004
 Vasiliy Zavoruev – 2005
 Ivan Nelyubov – 2006

Roster

References

External links
Official Site 

CSKA Moscow